The Harrow is a pub at 22 Whitefriars Street, London.

It is a Grade II listed building, built in the early 18th century, and was originally two houses.

References

External links

Grade II listed pubs in the City of London
Fuller's pubs